Frank Livingstone may refer to:

 Frank Livingstone (bowls) (1886–1966), New Zealand lawn bowls player
 Frank B. Livingstone (1928–2005), American biological anthropologist